Slang River is a river in Mpumalanga, South Africa, near the towns of Volksrust and Wakkerstroom.  The Zaaihoek Dam lies on the river.

See also
 List of rivers of South Africa

References 

Rivers of Mpumalanga